Belomorie (meaning Aegean Sea coastal lands), is the Bulgarian name for roughly the area of today's Greek province of Eastern Macedonia and Thrace, including the eastern part of Central Macedonia. The name comes from the South Slavic designation of the Aegean Sea, which is translated as the White Sea, in contrast to the Black Sea. The area was fully under Bulgarian control during the  First Balkan War, as well as during the First World War and partially in between. It was ruled as a province by Bulgaria with that name during the Axis occupation of Greece in World War II.

References

Bulgarian occupation of Greece during World War II
Bulgarian nationalism
Bulgaria in World War II
History of Western Thrace